"Drowning" is a song by Dutch disc jockey and producer Armin van Buuren. It features vocals from English singer and songwriter Laura V. It was released on 25 February in the Netherlands by Armind as the fourth single from van Buuren's fourth studio album, Mirage. Swedish disc jockey and producer Avicii made a remix of this song which was more popular.

Review 
According to Dylan Smith from webmedia EDM House Network, the Avicii remix of the song "was nothing short of magnificent, with Avicii putting his signature piano progressive house style onto the single and taking it to the next level".

Music video 
A music video to accompany the track was released to Armada Music's YouTube channel on 30 March 2011. This video was released a second time for the Avicii remix on 8 April 2011. Both videos were directed by Jelle Posthuma.

Track listing 
Netherlands - Digital download / 12" - Armind 
 "Drowning" (club mix) – 3:17
 "Drowning" (Avicii remix) – 7:52
 "Drowning" (Myon & Shane 54 classic mix) - 7:32

United States - Digital download / CD - Ultra 
 "Drowning" (radio edit) – 2:38
 "Drowning" (club mix) – 6:59
 "Drowning" (Avicii radio edit) – 3:24
 "Drowning" (Avicii remix) – 7:52
 "Drowning" (Myon & Shane 54 classic mix) - 7:32

Charts

References 

2011 songs
2011 singles
Armin van Buuren songs
Songs written by Armin van Buuren
Songs written by Benno de Goeij
Songs written by Miriam Nervo
Songs written by Olivia Nervo
Armada Music singles